This article lists nicknames for the city of Pittsburgh, Pennsylvania.

Major nicknames

City of Bridges
Pittsburgh boasts more bridges, owing to its location at the confluence of the Allegheny, Ohio, and Monongahela, than any other city or region in the world.
Steel City
Pittsburgh and the surrounding area was once one of the largest steel producers in the world, gaining it international renown as such. The U.S. Steel Tower remains the headquarters for that company.
Dirty 'Burgh
Pittsburgh and the surrounding area was once one of the largest producers of steel in the world. It was said that due to the pollution caused by the steel industry, you would leave for work in a white shirt and come home in an all black one.
The 'Burgh
Unlike many cities in America that end in burg (including the capital of the state, Harrisburg), Pittsburgh retains the h at the end of its name, making this quality instantly recognizable. 
City of Champions
Pittsburgh has enjoyed numerous sports championships from its three major league sports teams and the athletic programs at its many universities.

Minor nicknames
Iron City
The Pitt 
Derived from the name of the city and university, as well as the fact that downtown Pittsburgh is in a "hole" due to the hilly topography of the surrounding neighborhoods.
River City
Paris of Appalachia
Pittsburgh is the largest metropolitan area in the entire Appalachian region. 
Blitzburgh 
This references the Pittsburgh Steelers, winners of six Super Bowls and famed for their vaunted defense.

Sixburgh 
This is a reference to the six Super Bowls that the Pittsburgh Steelers won.
The 412
412 is the telephone area code for much of Allegheny County, though it covered much more geographically at the time the name was coined, prior to the introduction of 724. Both 412 and 724 are now part of an overlay complex in which the entire region served by those codes is also covered by 878.
Hell with the Lid Off
Boston writer James Parton described Pittsburgh as "hell with the lid off" in 1868. This was because of the smoke, smog, and fire that were prevalent during the city's steelmaking heyday.
The Only City with an Entrance
Traveling through the Fort Pitt Tunnel or Liberty Tunnels under Mount Washington yields, for many travelers, the first glimpse of the city's skyline.
Capital of/Largest City in West Virginia
So called because many West Virginians migrate to Pittsburgh.
Benigno Numine
Comes from the city's Latin motto. It is generally translated as "With the Benevolent Deity" or "By the Favour of Heaven".

See also
 List of city nicknames in Pennsylvania
 Lists of nicknames – nickname list articles on Wikipedia
 Name of Pittsburgh

References

Pittsburgh
Culture of Pittsburgh
Nicknames for Pittsburgh
Names of places in the United States